Johi may refer to:

 Jahi, a Zoroastrian demoness
Johi, Dadu, a town in Sindh, Pakistan
 Johi, Croatia, a village near Bosiljevo, Croatia
 Jonah Hill (born 1983), American actor